Al-Orouba Sporting Club (also known locally as Al-Marid, or "The Giant(s)", or just plainly as Al-Orouba) is an Omani sports club based in Sur, Oman. The club is currently playing in the Oman Professional League, top division of Oman Football Association. Their home ground is Sur Sports Complex. The stadium is government owned, but they also own their own personal stadium and sports equipments, as well as their own training facilities.

History 
The club was actually formed in 1956 in Kuwait and the name given was Al-Ahli. The first chairman of the club was late Sheikh Saleh Nasser Al-Hashar. In 1970, when His Majesty Sultan of Oman Qaboos bin Said al Said rose to power many Omanis came back and settled in Oman. In November 1970, the club officials met for the first time in Oman and one year after this meeting the club was renamed to Al-Orouba. The first chairman of Al-Orouba SC was Sheikh Ali Said Al-Alawi. The club was founded in 1970 and was registered on 26 June 2002.

Being a multisport club 
Although being mainly known for their football, Al-Orouba SC like many other clubs in Oman, have not only football in their list, but also hockey, volleyball, handball, basketball, badminton and squash. They also have a youth football team competing in the Omani Youth league.

Crest and colours 
Al-Orouba SC have been known since establishment to wear a full white (with green stripes on the trim) or green (Away) kit, varying themselves from neighbors Al-Tali'aa SC (orange) and Sur SC (blue) kits. They have also had many different sponsorships over the years. As of now, Uhlsport provides them with kits.

The Al-Orouba SC logo consists of a dow steering representing the history of Sur in dow making & historical sea trading. It consists of three rings indicating a link between sports, culture and society.

Support 

The club has a unique fan culture with an orchestra playing traditional arabic music during home matches.

Club participation in CSR activities 
Al-Orouba SC is participating in a variety of activities related to corporate social responsibility such as museum, seminars, parties and festivals and charities.

Museum 
There had always been the idea of creating a museum of the club which will inspire many of its members. Since its inception in 1986, the club members began to collect as much as possible historical collections which have been displayed in the museum.

Honours and achievements

National titles 
 Oman Professional League (4):
Winners 1999–2000, 2001–02, 2007–08, 2014–15
Runners-up 1991–92, 2000–01, 2004–05, 2006–07, 2010–11
 Sultan Qaboos Cup (4):
Winners 1993, 2001, 2010, 2014–15
Runners-up 1997, 2000, 2019–20
 Oman Super Cup (4):
Winners 2000, 2002, 2008, 2011
 Oman Youth League (U-19) (3):
Winners 2001–02
Runners-up 1994–95
 Oman Youth League (U-16) – Al-Sharqiya (3):
Winners 1992–93, 1993–94, 2002–03

Club performance-International Competitions

AFC competitions 
 Asian Club Championship : 1 appearance
1991 : Qualifying-Round One
 Asian Cup Winners' Cup : 1 appearance
1994–95 : First Round
 AFC Cup : 3 appearances
2009 : Group Stage
2011 : Group Stage
2012 : Group Stage

UAFA competitions 
 UAFA Club Cup : 3 appearances
2005–06 : Round of 32
2007–08 : Round of 32
2012–13 : First Round
 Gulf Club Champions Cup: 2 appearances
2003 : 4th Position
2009–10 : Group Stage

Players

First-team squad

Personnel

Technical staff

Management

References

External links 
 Al-Oruba SC at Soccerway
 Al-Oruba SC at Goalzz

Football clubs in Oman
Oman Professional League
Sur, Oman
Association football clubs established in 1970
1970 establishments in Oman